The Southwark North by-election by-election, 1939 was a parliamentary by-election held on 19 May 1939 for the British House of Commons constituency of Southwark North.

Previous MP

Previous Result

Candidates

Result

Aftermath 
In the 1945 general election,

References

Southwark North by-election
Southwark North by-election
Southwark North,1939
Southwark North,1939